Beautiful Redemption may refer to:

 Beautiful Redemption (album), a solo album by Chrissy Conway-Katina
 Beautiful Redemption (novel), a 2012 young adult novel by Kami Garcia and Margaret Stohl